Mutinta Buumba Mazoka M'membe (born ) is a Zambian newspaper owner and politician. She owns the independent publication The Mast.

Biography 
Mutinta Mazoka was born . Her parents are the late politician Anderson Mazoka and Mutinta C. Mazoka, a member of the National Assembly of Zambia.

Mazoka studied political science at Syracuse University, then worked for the National Democratic Institute for International Affairs in Washington, D.C., before attending graduate school at the American InterContinental University, graduating with an MBA. She went on to work in finance, with nonprofits, and on entrepreneurial ventures

She then became the publisher of The Mast, an independent newspaper in Zambia that was launched to continue the work of the shuttered Post. 

Mazoka is a member of the United Party for National Development, which was founded by her father, Anderson Mazoka. In the 2021 Zambian general election, she ran to represent Monze Central constituency in the assembly, but she lost during the primary vote. 

Her husband, Fred M'membe, is a Zambian journalist who ran the now-closed Post. In 2021, he ran for president as leader of the Socialist Party. Mazoka, however, chose to remain with the UPND—whose candidate, Hakainde Hichilema, eventually won the presidency—over joining the Socialist Party.

In February 2017, Mazoka was charged with attempting to prevent the arrest of her husband, but she was acquitted the following year. She was previously arrested in connection with she and M'membe's journalistic work in 2016.

References 

1977 births
Zambian women journalists
Zambian women in business
21st-century Zambian women politicians
21st-century Zambian politicians
United Party for National Development politicians
Syracuse University alumni
Living people